Snønuten is a mountain in the municipality of Suldal in Rogaland county, Norway. The mountains Kaldafjellet, Leirnuten, and Steinkilenuten all lie to the southeast of Snønuten.

See also
List of mountains of Norway

References

Mountains of Rogaland
Suldal